The Hudson River Derby, also known as the New York derby, is the name given to the soccer local derby between the two teams based in the New York metropolitan area, New York Red Bulls and New York City FC. First played in 2015, the rivalry between the two started almost as soon as the announcement was made of the formation of NYCFC in 2013.

Early on in the rivalry's history, the Red Bulls dominated the fixture, winning the first four games in the all-time series including one particular fixture, commonly referred to as 'The Red Wedding', in which the Red Bulls won 7–0. Since this game, however, New York City has gained traction in the derby, winning four of the last seven games in the season series (four out of nine in all competitions) and taking points in three straight league games in 2017. This derby for the most part is contested for bragging rights of being the best side in the New York metropolitan area during the current MLS regular season. The teams do not compete for a trophy like many of the older MLS rivalries, although one is planned for the 2021 season despite a delay due to the COVID-19 pandemic. Despite both teams appearing in the MLS Cup Playoffs since 2016, the teams have not yet met in a playoff match.

On July 12, 2019, three supporters groups—Empire Supporters Club and Viking Army from the Red Bulls, and The Third Rail from NYCFC—announced the formation of the Hudson River Derby Foundation, a non-profit corporation two years in the making, that will "grow, manage, and administer the annual Hudson River Derby competition" between the two clubs, and will develop a physical trophy to present to the annual winner.

History 

New York City has a significant history with top level club soccer including the New York Cosmos of the North American Soccer League, the most successful team in that competition's history. With New York's position as the most populous city in the United States, it was likely that when Major League Soccer (MLS) was founded in 1993, with play due to start in 1996, one of the founder clubs would play in the New York metropolitan area. This club, initially named as Empire Soccer Club, eventually started play in the 1996 MLS season as the NY/NJ MetroStars.

Since its start, MLS has engaged in a steady process of expansion from its initial ten clubs until 2010, when the league announced its intention to award its 20th franchise to New York City. Unlike the MetroStars, which were renamed as the New York Red Bulls following the franchise's purchase by Red Bull GmbH in 2006, the plan for the second New York franchise was for it to play in the city – the MetroStars began their existence playing in Giants Stadium in East Rutherford, New Jersey, before moving to a purpose built soccer-specific stadium in Harrison, Red Bull Arena. The 20th franchise was eventually awarded in 2013 to a consortium of the City Football Group and Yankee Global Enterprises, with the new club being given the name New York City FC.

New York City FC began play in the 2015 MLS season. The first league meeting with the Red Bulls was scheduled for May 10 at Red Bull Arena. The buildup to the game saw an increasing level of antagonism between both the clubs and their respective supporters groups, with the Red Bulls emphasizing their history from the start of MLS as opposed to the new club, with NYCFC pointing to the fact that they are the only club to play within the five boroughs. The first meeting between the two, in front of a capacity crowd, saw striker Bradley Wright-Phillips score the first goal in a 2–1 win for the Red Bulls. Subsequent to this game, there were two further league meetings between the teams, at Yankee Stadium and Red Bull Arena, both resulting in wins for the Red Bulls. NYCFC won their first game against the Red Bulls at the fifth time of asking on July 3, 2016 at Yankee Stadium. The Red Bulls 7–0 win at Yankee Stadium in 2016 is tied for the highest victory margin in MLS history. During a 3–2 New York City FC victory, David Villa recorded the derby's first ever hat trick on August 6, 2017.

In 2017, the Red Bulls and New York City FC played their first exhibition game and the first derby match in which it was played in a neutral stadium. The match was part of the 2017 Desert Diamond Cup in Tucson, Arizona with the match taking place on February 15, 2017. The Red Bulls won against New York City FC 2–0, with Sacha Kljestan scoring both goals to the Red Bulls on that game. Neither both NYFC and NYRB failed to go to the Consolation round as both teams ended at the bottom.

Fans 

A variety of supporters clubs and groups have grown around the Red Bulls since the team started. The first of these was formed in 1995, prior to the inception of the team itself, as the Empire Supporters Club. 2005 saw the creation of the New Jersey-based Garden State Supporters, now the Garden State Ultras (GSU). The 2010 season's influx of personnel with a Scandinavian background led to the creation of the Viking Army Supporters Club. The Red Bulls have designated some sections of Red Bull Arena as supporter specific. These included sections 101 for the Empire Supporters Club, 102 for the Viking Army, and section 133 for the Garden State Supporters. Sections 133, 101, and 102 are collectively known as the "South Ward".

New York City FC's first official supporter group, The Third Rail, began to form after the club's announcement in May 2013, when fans met through social media, and through member drives and viewing parties for 2014 FIFA World Cup matches. It had registered 1,000 members by September 20, 2014. Although the group operates independently from the club, it was recognized as the official supporter group and has received exclusive access to two sections in Yankee Stadium. Group president Chance Michaels said the name reflected the group's desire to "power NYCFC" the way the third rail powers the New York City subway system. Since the team started, unofficial supporters groups have sprung up, including Brown Bag SC and Hearts of Oak.

Even from the beginning of NYCFC's time in MLS, the rivalry between the supporters has been intense, with social media used extensively by both sets of fans to exchange insults and vitriol. Following the first meeting between the two sides at the Red Bull Arena, the Red Bulls cut the ticket allocation for away fans by two thirds for the next meeting at the venue, as a result of the behavior of NYCFC fans; NYCFC fans were equally damning of Red Bulls fans during their first visit to Yankee Stadium. Prior to their third and final league meeting of the 2015 season, the first reported incident of violence between the two sets of fans occurred at a gastropub in Newark frequented by members of the Garden State Ultras.

Transactions 
To date, only one trade has occurred between the two teams. On December 11, 2014, the Red Bulls sent Ryan Meara on a one-year loan to NYCFC for the rights to Sal Zizzo, who had been selected from Sporting Kansas City in the 2014 MLS Expansion Draft the previous day. Meara returned to the Red Bulls after the 2015 season.

Results

Statistics

Summary of results

Top goalscorers 

 

Players currently playing for their respective Hudson River Derby club are in bold

Alexander Callens for New York City FC is the fastest to score a goal, as he scored in 57 seconds on September 17th, 2022

Honors
Table correct as of 2022 season.

Players who played for both clubs 

Players currently playing for their respective Hudson River Derby club are written in bold.

See also
 MLS rivalry cups
 Islanders–Rangers rivalry
 Devils–Rangers rivalry
 Subway Series
 Mets–Yankees rivalry
 Knicks–Nets rivalry
 Giants–Jets rivalry

Notes

References

Major League Soccer rivalries
New York Red Bulls
New York City FC
2015 establishments in New York (state)
2015 establishments in New Jersey
Soccer in the New York metropolitan area